Magenta is a coastal location of the Central Coast region of New South Wales, Australia. It is part of the  local government area, and contains a significant portion of the Wyrrabalong National Park.

Magenta is a relatively new area to be developed for residence, with the suburb gazetted in 1991. Previously it was the location for rutile mining and as the garbage tip for The Entrance, New South Wales. The location is traversed south–north by Wilfred Barrett Drive linking The Entrance and Toukley, named after a Wyong Shire President. The road was designated part of the Central Coast Highway in 2006.

Magenta Shores 
The Magenta Shores Golf Resort consists of an 18-hole golf course, private housing and a resort.

References

Suburbs of the Central Coast (New South Wales)